Gustavo Adolfo Puerta Molano (born 23 July 2003) is a Colombian footballer currently playing as a midfielder for German side 1. FC Nürnberg, on loan from Bayer Leverkusen.

Club career
Born in La Victoria, Valle del Cauca, Puerta started playing football at the Talentos Gustavo Victoria Deportes school in Tuluá. He also played for amateur side Supercampeones between the ages of ten and sixteen.

Initially rejected by Colombian Categoría Primera A side Independiente Santa Fe in 2019 after a trial, Puerta went on to join second division side Bogotá in 2021.

On 31 January 2023, Puerta moved to German Bundesliga side Bayer Leverkusen, before immediately being loaned to 1. FC Nürnberg in the 2. Bundesliga.

International career
Puerta has represented Colombia at under-20 level. He served as captain of the side at the 2023 South American U-20 Championship.

Career statistics

Club

References

2003 births
Living people
People from Valle del Cauca Department
Colombian footballers
Colombia youth international footballers
Association football midfielders
Categoría Primera B players
Bayer 04 Leverkusen players
1. FC Nürnberg players
Colombian expatriate footballers
Colombian expatriate sportspeople in Germany
Expatriate footballers in Germany